The Swedish Fiscal Policy Council is a Swedish government agency organized under the Ministry of Finance tasked with providing an independent evaluation of the Government's fiscal policy. It was established in Stockholm 2007, to review and assess the extent to which the fiscal and economic policy objectives decided on by the Riksdag are being met. Objectives include long-term sustainability of public finances and economic growth, maintaining a target surplus, staying below the expenditure ceiling set by the Riksdag, and a consistent fiscal policy. The Council also promote a public debate on economic policy, and evaluate economic forecasts on which economic assessments by the Government are based. This is primarily done with the annual publication of a report, through conferences, and studies on the Swedish fiscal policy.

Annual report
The Council publishes an annual independent evaluation of the Government's fiscal policy, presented to the Minister for Finance. It's available on-line in English.

See also
Similar agencies and organizations in other countries:
Federal Planning Bureau - Belgium
Parliamentary Budget Officer - Canada
German Council of Economic Experts - Germany
Bureau for Economic Policy Analysis - Netherlands
Korean National Assembly Budget Office - South Korea
Office for Budget Responsibility - United Kingdom
Congressional Budget Office - USA

References

External links
The Swedish Fiscal Policy Council – Official website (English)

Government agencies of Sweden
2007 establishments in Sweden
Economy of Sweden
Economic research institutes
Fiscal policy